Johann Rudolf Suter (29 March 1766, Zofingen – 24 February 1827, Bern) was a Swiss physician, botanist and philologist.

Life
He studied natural history at the University of Göttingen, obtaining his PhD in 1787. From 1791 to 1793, he studied medicine at Mainz, and after receiving his medical doctorate at Göttingen (1794), he became a medical practitioner in his hometown of Zofingen.

From 1798 to 1801, he was a member of the council for the Helvetian Republic, and afterwards was a practicing physician and private scientist in Bern (1801–1804) and Zofingen (1811–1820). In 1820 he was appointed a professor of philosophy and Greek at the Academy of Bern.

He was the author of the two-volume Flora Helvetica (1802). The plant genus Sutera (family Scrophulariaceae) was named in his honor by German botanist Albrecht Wilhelm Roth (1807).

References 

1766 births
1827 deaths
People from Zofingen
19th-century Swiss botanists
Johannes Gutenberg University Mainz alumni
University of Göttingen alumni
18th-century Swiss botanists